Riverton Township may refer to the following places in the United States:

 Riverton Township, Clay County, Iowa
 Riverton Township, Floyd County, Iowa
 Riverton Township, Michigan
 Riverton Township, Clay County, Minnesota

See also

Riverton (disambiguation)

Township name disambiguation pages